"" is a song by Italian singer and rapper Blanco. It was produced by Michelangelo, and released as a single on 23 July 2020 by Island Records and Universal Music.

The song peaked at number 2 on the FIMI single chart and ranked sixth in the 2021 year-end single chart. It was certified quintuple platinum in Italy.

Music video
The music video for "", directed by Simone Peluso, premiered on 30 July 2020 via Blanco's YouTube channel. , the video has over 40 million views on YouTube.

Personnel
Credits adapted from Tidal.
 Blanco – associated performer, author, vocals
 Michelangelo – producer, composer
 Davide Simonetta – composer

Charts

Weekly charts

Year-end charts

Certifications

References

Blanco (singer) songs
2020 songs
2020 singles
Island Records singles
Songs written by Blanco (singer)
Songs written by Davide Simonetta